Dinah Washington Sings Fats Waller is a seventh studio album by blues, R&B and jazz singer Dinah Washington released on the Emarcy label, and reissued by Verve Records in 1990 as The Fats Waller Songbook. In the album Washington covers 12 songs that have been penned or performed by jazz pianist, organist, singer and songwriter Fats Waller. Allmusic details the album in its review as saying: "Dinah Washington Sings Fats Waller appropriately brings together Waller's vivacious songs and Washington's demonstrative vocal talents. The jazz diva effortlessly handles Waller classics while turning in particularly emotive renditions. Adding nice variety to the already strong set, Washington's husband at the time, saxophonist Eddie Chamblee, joins the singer for playful duets on "Honeysuckle Rose" and "Everybody Loves My Baby".

Track listing
"Christopher Columbus" (Chu Berry, Andy Razaf) – 2:45
"Tain't Nobody's Biz-ness if I Do" (Porter Grainger, Robert Graham Prince, Clarence Williams) – 3:25
"Jitterbug Waltz" (Fats Waller) – 2:45
"Someone's Rocking My Dreamboat" (Leon René, Emerson Scott) – 1:58
"Ain't Cha Glad?" (Fats Waller, Andy Razaf) – 2:43
"Squeeze Me" (Fats Waller, Clarence Williams) – 2:07
"Ain't Misbehavin''" (Fats Waller, Harry Brooks, Andy Razaf) – 2:32
"Black and Blue" (Fats Waller, Harry Brooks, Andy Razaf) – 2:55
"Everybody Loves My Baby" (Spencer Williams, Jack Palmer) – 2:36
"I've Got a Feeling I'm Falling" (Fats Waller, Harry Link, Billy Rose) – 2:23
"Honeysuckle Rose" (Fats Waller, Andy Razaf) – 2:33
"Keepin' Out of Mischief Now" (Fats Waller, Andy Razaf) – 2:34

Personnel
Dinah Washington – Lead Vocals
Eddie Chamblee – Saxophone (Tenor), Vocals
Benny Golson – Saxophone (Tenor)
Hal McKusick – Saxophone (Alto)
Sahib Shihab – Saxophone (Alto)
Jerome Richardson – Flute, Saxophone (Alto)
Frank Wess – Flute, Saxophone (Tenor)
Jack Wilson – Piano
Patti Bown – Piano
Jimmy Cleveland – Trombone
Rod Levitt – Trombone (Bass)
Melba Liston –  Trombone
Julian Priester –	Trombone
Chauncey Welsch – Trombone
Sonny Russo – Trombone
Johnny Coles – Trumpet
Ray Copeland – Trumpet
Reunald Jones – Trumpet
Joe Newman Quartet – Trumpet
Ernie Royal – Trumpet
Doc Severinsen – Trumpet
Charlie Shavers – Trumpet
Clark Terry – Trumpet
Charles Davis – Saxophone (Baritone)
Richard Evans – Bass
Freddie Green – Guitar
Wesley Landers – Percussion
Sebastian Muro – Guitar
Charlie Persip – Drums
Ernie Wilkins – Arranger, Conductor
Bob Shad – producer

References

Dinah Washington albums
1957 albums
EmArcy Records albums
Albums produced by Bob Shad
Albums arranged by Ernie Wilkins
Albums conducted by Ernie Wilkins
Fats Waller tribute albums